Big Brother Australia 2008 or Big Brother 8 was the eighth season of the Australian reality television show Big Brother and was the final season to air on Network Ten.

The eighth season launched on 28 April 2008. A total 20 housemates competed in the show. Halfway through the show, the prize money was revealed to be $250,000, the amount originally given in the earlier season of the show.

Season 8 introduced Kyle Sandilands and Jackie O as the new hosts, replacing Gretel Killeen, who had previously hosted the show from Season 1. It also featured the return of an adult-themed weekly installment titled Big Mouth.

Production

Auditions
Auditions opened in late 2007. People wishing to audition were required to post a video audition of themselves on the official Big Brother website. Voting closed on 7 January 2008. The three people with the highest number of votes would be guaranteed a place in the House with the top 50 others to go through a second selection process.

This season featured a new audition process similar to the format used in the earlier seasons, where people wishing to audition sent in a tape rather than attending cattle call audition sessions. For the first time in Big Brother Australia history, the public could vote which housemates they wanted to see in the House before the start of the show.

Promotions 
Promotional advertisements for the new season premiered on 6 April 2008 featuring a short video of former Australian Prime Minister John Howard criticising the show in 2006, stating that Channel Ten should "get this stupid show off the air", followed by the tagline "I Don't Think So" from the eponymous Kelis track.

The show
This season began Monday 28 April 2008 at 7:00 pm. The opening episode had the lowest-ever ratings of any launch of Big Brother Australia. The episode mostly outrated its competitors in most timeslots—except its second half-hour when it lost out to Border Security. The audience for the launch peaked at 1.91 million.

This season lasted a total of 84 days. The 2008 finale aired on Monday 21 July 2008 at 7:00 pm on Network Ten. It was the first Big Brother Australia finale to feature three finalists and the first hosted by Kyle Sandilands and Jackie O.

Broadcasts
Starting this season, new hosts Kyle Sandilands and Jackie O replaced Gretel Killeen, who had hosted since the show's launch in 2001.
The nomination and eviction processes were changed for this season and those elements were both covered in the same weekly episode of the program. In previous seasons nominations and evictions were conducted separately and each had a weekly special dedicated to them.

A new panel discussion program titled Big Brother's Big Mouth was hosted by Tony Squires and Rebecca Wilson. This show was similar in format to the UK Big Brother panel show of the same name. It screened Monday nights, initially at 9:30 pm before being moved later due to low ratings.

Big Brother: UpLate did not air this season due to Ten's late night programming schedule being used for Indian Premier League cricket telecasts in May and June. In comparison to 2007's broadcast, this season saw 11 hours less free-to-air telecasts a week, solely due to the absence of Mike Goldman's Big Brother: UpLate.

Television broadcast episodes featured a slightly updated logo and graphics, and much shorter theme music intros to each show.

The free internet streaming was also changed. The time allotted to free streaming was cut to three five-minute blocks per-day. The full-membership subscriptions cost around A$33.00.

The House
The House was rebuilt with a new layout as has occurred with most seasons of Big Brother Australia. The bedroom contained just one big bed for all housemates to share. The garden featured a Volkswagen Type 2 in which one housemate had to sleep. There was also a vending machine in the garden. The housemates could buy various items such as snacks, and sunglasses. Coins for the vending machine were distributed to housemates as a reward for sustaining good behaviour.

Nomination and eviction voting format
In the previous season of Big Brother, housemates nominated two other housemates for eviction and viewers then voted to actually evict. In this season the nominations were based on viewer votes collected through the week. The public were only able to vote for which housemate to save from eviction. The three housemates with the fewest save votes were nominated for eviction on Sunday. The housemates then voted to evict one of these three. Housemates gave two points to one person they want evicted, and one point to another of the three.

The winner of Friday Night Games had the power to remove one nominated housemate from the nomination lineup, after which the housemate(s) in fourth place moved into the nomination lineup. In awarding eviction points, the winner could award four points to one person, and two points to another.

After five weeks, the nomination and eviction process reverted to the traditional format of all previous seasons: the housemates nominate, and viewers vote for the housemate to be evicted. Unlike the preceding few seasons, there was no save vote for nominated housemates; viewers could only vote to evict.

At the start of this season, Big Brother announced to the housemates that "snap evictions" will be executed at various points during the show. Terri was evicted on the first night in what was described as a "snap eviction", but she was soon returned to the house. Two of the three viewer-voted housemates, Barney and Michael, were quickly removed in what was described by the show's makers as a "snap eviction". In the final week, housemates were asked to vote to evict two housemates in a surprise "snap eviction". Alice and Travis were "evicted" and moved to another section of the compound. Later, it was revealed to Alice and Travis, and then the other housemates, that this eviction was fake and Alice and Travis returned to the main House.

Housemates
It was initially confirmed that there would be 18 housemates this season. One housemate quit before the show started and ultimately 14 housemates entered the House on the opening night, with an additional three entering in the first and sixth week.

House guests
There were several celebrity guests appearances featured during this season. Carson Kressley arrived and gave the housemates a makeover to promote his new show, How to Look Good Naked. He stayed for only several hours. Former housemate Rima returned briefly late in the show. Rima was originally a housemate, but left after breaking her leg on the first Friday Night Live games. She returned on Day 63 with a special task of telling the housemates that there was a mole among them. She left on Day 66 after a four-day return.

Pamela Anderson entered as a guest on Day 73, then returned the following day for a special task. She did not stay in the house overnight. When asked how much she was paid to do the show, she said, "Much more than I am worth" and "I don't want to say how much but it is a lot."
The day after her first Big Brother appearance, Anderson took part in a campaign against alleged KFC cruelty outside Southport KFC Restaurant, Gold Coast, where she hand-delivered a letter to the manager opposing expressing her concerns. Anderson's appearance generated the highest ratings of the entire season to that time.

Friday Night Live themes and winners

Reception
After the telecast of the season's third eviction show, critic Andrew Mercado summarised the 2008 season eviction shows, which he described as in previous seasons being a viewing highlight of the season, as having descended into "just a boring, hateful shemozzle, where Kyle insults everybody around him (housemates are psychos, the crew are work experience and the audience is a 'pack of pigs')."
The 2008 season showed a marked downturn in ratings for the program. Both the Daily Show and the eviction shows rated significantly lower than previous seasons. Ratings for the first 2008 eviction were half those achieved by eviction shows during the program's peak. Academic Alan McKee singled-out the departure of previous host Gretel Killeen as having weakened the season. McKee judged that Killeen had successfully provided the show's "moral centre". Of the replacement hosts, McKee said that "Kyle and Jackie O just don't serve the same purpose. Jackie is quite limp and Kyle prides himself on just being wrong—he will always say the wrong, obnoxious thing and hurt people."

By the eviction show on 1 June 2008, the program's ratings were said to have "almost flatlined on Sunday night, dropping below 500,000 in the key demographic along the East Coast." Host Kyle Sandilands called in sick for this program and his co-hosting duties were handled by usual show announcer and narrator Mike Goldman.
Sandilands missed his second eviction show the following week, 8 June 2008, after again calling in sick, with a severe chest infection. It was reported that hundreds of fans took to message boards calling for Mike Goldman, his stand-in for the 1 June and 8 June eviction episodes, to become a permanent eviction host. Some speculated Sandilands had already been sacked; others accused him of faking his illness. A spokeswoman for the season said Sandilands was expected to return for the following eviction show. Another commentator, Peter Craven, described the 2008 season as being increasingly gimmicky. The visit by Carson Kressley to make over the housemates was seen as an obvious gimmick; when Kressley made a second appearance in another makeover episode screened several days later, Craven felt that it looked forced.

The visit by hypnotist Peter Powers (Craven erroneously named Derren Brown as the hypnotist visitor) was described as being "riveting", but also as turning Big Brother into more a variety show. The choice of eccentric housemates and an appearance by Corey Worthington was seen as an attempt "to highlight the superficially weird" while the absence of Uplate and Uncut for 2008 was judged by Craven as being a mistake. Craven suggested the worst mistake of the season was replacing Gretel Killeen, whom Craven praised for being "formidable and charismatic" and skilled at her role, with new hosts. Craven judged Kyle Sandilands the more intelligent of the new hosts, but noted he gave no impression of having kept up with the show, as Killeen always did. Craven believed Sandilands to be "sensationally ill-suited to the format, which requires a warm embrace of the Big Brother ethos. By contrast, Jackie O, as the good cop was seen all vapid smiles and gooey attentiveness."

In a news report where the season was described as suffering a "ratings slump" and where the new hosts were said to have been unable to save the show, former host Killeen was quoted as saying she refused to watch the current season and refused to comment on its low ratings. "I haven't watched it because I don't want to be in the situation where I am not telling the truth and I know people will want to know my opinion of it and I think it is much better not to have seen it," Killeen said. "I don't think it's dignified for me to come back and say this should be done like this and this should be changed."

Ratings

Ratings are rounded to the nearest ten thousand. Big Mouth Shows are not included in official averages. Figures in bold include consolidated viewing figures.

Cancellation
The season rated poorly, leading to the cancellation of the series, announced 13 July 2008. Ten's chief programmer, David Mott, admitted the season had recently experienced "audience erosion" and widespread criticism of the new hosts. Mott reasoned that after so many seasons there were few new surprises in the format, leading to reduced viewing figures. Mott defended the new hosts saying that the ratings for eviction shows held up. The lowest-rating component of the season was the Big Mouth late night weekly panel show. Its audience slipped to the half-a-million mark and it was moved to a later time slot. A new season of Big Brother was announced in 2011.

Weekly summary

Voting and nominations table 
The voting format changed throughout the season.
 For the first half of the season, the public voted for whom to save from nomination. The bottom three Housemates with the lowest saves were up for eviction. The Housemates then voted for whom to evict, with the first vote receiving 2 points and the second, 1 point. The Housemate with the most points was then evicted. This year introduced a Head of House, who has the power to save someone in the bottom three from eviction. The person with the 4th lowest saves is then up for eviction. The Head of House also votes with double eviction points.
 In the second half of the season the voting format reverted to that of previous seasons. Housemates vote to nominate other housemates for eviction and the public then vote for whom to evict from those nominated. In this second eviction procedure the Head of House still has the power to remove one nominated housemate from the original nomination lineup, but no longer has double voting points.

 – A feature that was not in use during at the time.

Notes

Big Brother revealed to the Housemates that someone will be evicted the next day. Housemates had to decide who would leave the House on Day 1. Rima was removed from the house after breaking her leg.
 Terri returned to the House along with Corey as House Guests. Big Brother set Terri a mission to be Corey's guardian during his time in the House. If successful, she would be re-instated as a Housemate. However, she failed this mission.
On Day 9, Big Brother announced another snap eviction. Corey was initially offered the task of deciding which two of the three housemates voted in by the Australian public would be evicted. Corey declined this task. It was then offered to Terri and she accepted the task after failing her original task given to her by Big Brother. After the eviction, Terri was re-instated as a Housemate.
On Day 12, during FNL, Big Brother announced the winner of FNL would also become Head of House, who would get to vote with double eviction points, and get a dinner for two in the Strategy Room, where they are allowed to talk about nominations and eviction. Nathan won FNL, but because he was exempt from eviction, runner-up Travis took his place.
Although Nathan won FNL, since he was exempt and couldn't vote, Big Brother gave the eviction duties of Head of House to the runner-up, Travis.
As Rebecca was evicted, she had to give her rights as HOH to another housemates. During her goodbye message, she gave the rights as HOH to Alice.
This week was a double eviction; the two Housemates with the highest points were evicted.
Intruders Cherry, Rhianna and Terrence entered the House on Day 35.
On Day 36, Brigitte (six points), Alice (six points) and Bianca (four points) were nominated for eviction. However, evicted Housemate Dixie used a Housemate Hand Grenade and saved Alice from eviction. Both Renee and Terri were then nominated in place of Alice. Both Terri and Renee had three nomination points total.
On Day 77, Alice and Travis were evicted. Later, this eviction was revealed as fake.
This year, the public voted for whom to evict, not win. The winner was the person with the fewest votes to evict.

Housemate Hand Grenades 
This season, housemates evicted by the usual process are given the power to decide which housemate receives the penalty—or sometimes the benefit—which has been devised by Big Brother for that eviction. These are dubbed the 'Housemate Hand Grenade' by the makers of the show. Sometimes, the ruling is permanent. Rulings later removed are marked by (R).

Special shows

The Gatecrashers

Crowded House

Housemates Hypnotised

Live Eviction 4 / Intruder Alert

Pamela Anderson Busts In / Surprise Eviction

The Big Sting

Playing to Win

Final Sunday Double Eviction

Finale

References

External links 
 Official Site

08
2008 Australian television seasons